Alternaria dianthicola is a fungal plant pathogen.

References

External links

dianthicola
Fungal plant pathogens and diseases
Fungi described in 1945